Velim is a municipality and village in Kolín District in the Central Bohemian Region of the Czech Republic. It has about 2,300 inhabitants.

Administrative parts
The village of Vítězov is an administrative part of Velim.

Notable people
Stanislava Součková (1923–1997), operatic soprano
Vladimír Karbusický (1925–2002), musicologist and folklorist
Jaroslav Souček (1935–2006), operatic baritone

See also
Velim railway test circuit

References

Villages in Kolín District